DZP may refer to

Barker/DZP, advertising agency
Dartmoor Zoological Park, an English zoo
Dzeltenie Pastnieki, Latvian band
Centre Party (Germany) (Deutsche Zentrumspartei)
DZP, professional wrestling tag team consisting of Primo and Zack Ryder